The Sedan railway line branched off from the South Australian Railways' Adelaide to Wolseley line at Monarto South running 70 kilometres north to Sedan.

History
The Sedan line opened Monarto South to Sedan on 13 October 1919. The original stations were at Pallamana, Tepko, Apamurra, Milendella, Sanderston, Kanappa, Cambrai, and Sedan, with station buildings and livestock loading facilities at Appamurra, Cambrai and Sedan.

On 1 June 1964, the line was curtailed to Cambrai, briefly reopening in 1967 to assist in the construction of the Swan Reach to Sedan pipeline. It was cut back further to Apamurra on 9 October 1987. Parts of the line between Apamurra and Cambrai were removed in 2001 by the Pichi Richi Railway Preservation Society for use on its Stirling North to Port Augusta line.

In August 1995, work commenced to gauge convert the line south of Apamurra to standard gauge. It reopened on 20 November 1995. The line closed in 2005.

References

Closed railway lines in South Australia
Railway lines opened in 1919
Railway lines closed in 2005
Standard gauge railways in Australia